Stevan Zorić (born 25 May 1971 in Novi Sad) is a Serbian former high jumper who competed in the 1992 Summer Olympics, in the 1996 Summer Olympics, and in the 2000 Summer Olympics. He is a bronze medalist from 1990 World Junior Championships in Athletics.

Competition record

References

1971 births
Living people
Serbian male high jumpers
Olympic athletes as Independent Olympic Participants
Olympic athletes of Yugoslavia
Athletes (track and field) at the 1992 Summer Olympics
Athletes (track and field) at the 1996 Summer Olympics
Athletes (track and field) at the 2000 Summer Olympics
Sportspeople from Novi Sad
Yugoslav male high jumpers
Mediterranean Games gold medalists for Yugoslavia
Athletes (track and field) at the 1997 Mediterranean Games
Universiade medalists in athletics (track and field)
Mediterranean Games medalists in athletics
Universiade silver medalists for Serbia and Montenegro
Medalists at the 1993 Summer Universiade